Edward Hymes Jr. (December 4, 1908 – October 17, 1962) was an American bridge and chess player. Hymes was an attorney and was from New York City.

At age 26, he joined the ACBL Laws Commission, which stipulates the rules of bridge.  His main partner was Oswald Jacoby. Like his father before him, he was also a chess player.

Bridge accomplishments

Wins

 North American Bridge Championships (7)
 Open Pairs (1928-1962) (1) 1935 
 Vanderbilt (1) 1940 
 Spingold (1) 1935 
 Masters Team of 4 (1) 1937 
 Spingold (3) 1941, 1943, 1945

Runners-up

 North American Bridge Championships
 Vanderbilt (3) 1935, 1938, 1945 
 Spingold (1) 1933 
 Masters Team of 4 (1) 1936 
 Spingold (1) 1940

Notes

American contract bridge players
American chess players
1908 births
1962 deaths
Lawyers from New York City
20th-century American lawyers
20th-century chess players